The Dubuque Police Department is the municipal police department for the city of Dubuque, Iowa.  The department currently consists has a staff of 92 sworn officers and 11 civilians.  The Chief of the department is Mark Dalsing.

The department is located at 770 Iowa Street, and shares facilities and other resources with the Dubuque County sheriff's office. The department patch is based loosely on the patch worn by officers within the San Francisco Police, as it incorporates a Phoenix.

Fallen officers

In the history of the Dubuque Police Department, two officers have been killed in the line of duty.

See also

 List of law enforcement agencies in Iowa

References

External links
 Dubuque Police website
 Dubuque Police Scanner Streaming Audio
 Dubuque Police Department Arrest Records

Dubuque, Iowa
Municipal police departments of Iowa